Artag may refer to:

 ARTag, a fiduciary marker system to support augmented reality
 Artoces of Iberia, a king of Georgia from 78 to 63 BC
 Tömöriin Artag, a Mongolian Olympic freestyle wrestler